Ella Mae Florence Powell (born 1 February 2000) is a Welsh footballer who plays as a forward for Bristol City in the FA Women's Championship and for the Wales national team.

Club career 
Powell progressed through the Cardiff City Ladies youth team, before joining NCAA college team Georgia State Panthers in 2018. In June 2019, Powell returned to the UK to sign for Lewes in the FA Women's Championship. She left at the end of the 2019–20 season.

International career 
Powell made her debut for the Wales national team in the 1–0 friendly defeat against Portugal on 10 November 2018. She made her first start for the senior team in the next match on 13 November.

Notes

References

External links 
 
 

2000 births
Living people
Wales women's international footballers
Women's association football defenders
Women's association football forwards
Welsh women's footballers
Georgia State Panthers women's soccer players
Lewes F.C. Women players
Charlton Athletic W.F.C. players
Bristol City W.F.C. players
Women's Championship (England) players
Footballers from Cardiff